Koffee with DD is an Indian Tamil-language talk show aired on Star Vijay, hosted by Dhivyadharshini.The show was inspired from Bollywood talk show Koffee with Karan which airs on Star World.The show was previously hosted by Suchitra and Anu Hasan with the names Koffee with Suchi and Koffee with Anu.

Season 1
Divyadarshini was installed as a new host for the show in 29 September 2013, replaced Actress Anu Hassan under the title of Koffee with Anu then Singer turned Actress Suchitra titled as Koffee with Suchi respectively, and presented a further series. Guests included:

Season 2
The second series started in 5 October 2014.

References

External links
 Official page on Hotstar

Star Vijay original programming
2006 Tamil-language television series debuts
Tamil-language talk shows
Tamil-language television shows
2017 Tamil-language television series endings